Too Many Cooks is a 1931 American pre-Code comedy film directed by William A. Seiter, written by Jane Murfin and starring Bert Wheeler, Dorothy Lee, Roscoe Ates and Robert McWade. It was released on July 18, 1931 by RKO Pictures.

Plot
Engaged couple Albert Bennett and Alice Cook plan to leave the city to build their dream house in the country. They argue about the floorplan, particularly an upstairs room that Albert wishes to use as a den and Alice wants as a sewing room. The problem is worsened when Alice’s family members come to help, each offering opinions about the room.

Albert’s bachelor uncle and employer George inspects the house. He is enthusiastic about the recent return of his friend's young daughter Minnie from Europe, where she completed her cultural education. George hopes that Albert might cancel the upcoming wedding and court the virtuous Minnie. Albert refuses, describing Alice's virtues in a similarly positive light.

George offers to pay for the room if he may inhabit it when the house is built. Alice’s family vehemently opposes the idea, prompting George to mention Minnie as someone whom Albert could pursue. Alice cancels the engagement, returning her ring to Albert and tearfully suggesting that it might fit Minnie's finger. George fires Albert.

Albert, unemployed and single, completes the house himself but then decides to sell it. Alice returns to see the now completed house and reconciles with Albert. George, now married to Minnie, returns and rehires Albert. George purchases the house but then returns it to Albert and Alice as a wedding gift.

Cast 
 Bert Wheeler as Albert 'Al' Bennett
 Dorothy Lee as Alice Cook
 Roscoe Ates as Mr. Wilson 
 Robert McWade as Uncle George Bennett
 Sharon Lynn as Ella Mayer
 Hallam Cooley as Frank Andrews
 Florence Roberts as Mrs. Cook
 George Chandler as Cousin Ned
 Clifford Dempsey as Mr. Michael J. Cook
 Ruth Weston as Minnie Spring

Preservation status
 A copy is preserved in the Library of Congress collection as with many RKO features.

References

External links
 
 
 
 

1931 films
American comedy films
1931 comedy films
American black-and-white films
1930s English-language films
RKO Pictures films
Films directed by William A. Seiter
Films with screenplays by Jane Murfin
1930s American films